Reid State Technical College is a public community college in Evergreen, Alabama.  The college was established in 1963 and classes began in 1966.

References

External links
Official website

Community colleges in Alabama
Education in Conecuh County, Alabama
Educational institutions established in 1963
Buildings and structures in Conecuh County, Alabama
1963 establishments in Alabama
Educational institutions accredited by the Council on Occupational Education